Andrew Charles Sandell (born 8 September 1983) is an English professional footballer who plays as a striker after a professional career as a left sided defender or midfielder.

Career

Trainee and non-League football
Sandell began his career as a trainee at Bristol City after coming through the youth system at Forest Green Rovers. Spells at Malmesbury Victoria and Melksham Town followed before he moved to Western League Premier Division side Paulton Rovers. He then joined Bath City for £1,500 and he was then offered a trial at Swansea City at the end of 2005. In the 2005–06 season he scored eight goals for Bath City, as they finished as runners-up, in the Southern Football League Premier Division. They went on to lose the subsequent play-off semi-final to Bedford Town.

Bristol Rovers
In the summer of 2006, Sandell joined Bristol Rovers and made his Football League debut at Peterborough United on the opening day of the season. That season Bristol Rovers reached the League Two Play-off Final, where they beat Shrewsbury Town 3–1. Bristol Rovers also reached the Football League Trophy final, which they lost 3–2 to Doncaster Rovers.

Salisbury City
In August 2007, Sandell joined Salisbury City on a month's loan from Bristol Rovers, with the move eventually made permanent. He scored three goals throughout the season. In the 2008–09 season Sandell played 16 games for Salisbury City and scored five times.

Aldershot Town
In November 2008, Sandell joined Aldershot Town on loan until January. The move was made permanent when the transfer window opened and Sandell signed a contract until the end of the 2009–10 season.

Wycombe Wanderers
Sandell joined Wycombe Wanderers upon expiry of his contract in June 2010, penning a two-year deal. In his first season for the club he gained the reputation of a free kick specialist, scoring 5 times from set pieces in the 2010–11 season.

On 10 October 2011, Sandell signed for Forest Green Rovers in a three-month loan deal, returning to the club where he was a member of the under 18's squad over a decade before. Sandell made his Forest Green debut the next day in an away loss against Hayes & Yeading United. Sandell went on to make further appearances against AFC Telford United and Kettering Town for Forest Green until his loan contract was terminated early following an incident at the club. Sandell subsequently returned to Wycombe but was however released on 7 November 2011.

Chippenham Town
On 10 November 2011, Sandell joined Chippenham Town so that he could get back to match fitness to look for a new Football League club in the January transfer window.

In December 2011, Sandell reached the final stages of an open try out at Major League Soccer outfit Chicago Fire.

Newport County
On 6 January 2012 Sandell joined Conference National club Newport County. Sandell made his Newport debut the following day in a 2–0 loss against Luton Town. He then agreed a new contract with the club to remain at Newport for the 2012–13 season in June 2012. In the 2012–13 season he was part of the Newport team that finished 3rd in the league, reaching the Conference National playoffs. Newport County won the playoff final versus Wrexham at Wembley stadium 2–0 to return to the Football League after a 25-year absence with promotion to League Two.

He was released by Newport in May 2015 at the end of his contract.

Chippenham Town
In July 2015, Sandell signed for Chippenham Town as a forward. In August it was also announced that Andy would take the vacant Commercial Manager role at the club.

At the end of the 2015/16 season, Sandell was awarded the Southern League Premier Division Golden Boot after scoring the most goals in the league, 22 in total.

In the 2016/17 season, Sandell helped Chippenham to win the Southern League Premier Division. He was once again awarded the Southern League Premier Division Golden Boot after scoring 27 goals in the league.

Sandell left Chippenham Town in December 2018 to recover from an ACL Injury.

Later career
Sandell had spells at both Melksham Town and Paulton Rovers, taking up a player-coach role at the latter.

Career statistics

References

External links

1983 births
Living people
Sportspeople from Swindon
English footballers
Association football defenders
Malmesbury Victoria F.C. players
Melksham Town F.C. players
Paulton Rovers F.C. players
Bath City F.C. players
Bristol Rovers F.C. players
Salisbury City F.C. players
Aldershot Town F.C. players
Wycombe Wanderers F.C. players
Forest Green Rovers F.C. players
Chippenham Town F.C. players
Newport County A.F.C. players
English Football League players
National League (English football) players
Southern Football League players
Western Football League players